The 2011 British National Track Championships were held between 28 September 2011 and 2 October 2011. The event was organised by British Cycling, and competitions of various track cycling disciplines in age, gender and disability categories were held.

The competition was staged at the National Track Cycling Centre at the Manchester Velodrome, the venue for the track cycling at the 2002 Commonwealth Games.

The event was notable for the return to form of Sir Chris Hoy, who claimed three national titles, and the emergence of Jonathan Mould, and the future world champions Becky James and Lizzie Armitstead, who won two titles each.

Events - Elite level

References

2011 in track cycling
National Track Championships
British National Track Championships
British National Track Championships